Klaus Storck (11 February 1928 – 18 March 2011) was a German cellist who appeared internationally as soloist and chamber musician. He also edited music for cello. He often appeared in a duo with his wife, the harpist Helga Storck, and composers wrote music for them.

Life 
Storck was born in Berlin. He received his first cello lessons at the age of eight. After transferring to the Musisches Gymnasium Frankfurt, he studied there with Rudolf Metzmacher. From autumn 1946, Storck studied at the Hochschule für Musik Detmold with Hans Münch-Holland. He spent several years studying with Enrico Mainardi, on a scholarship of the Studienstiftung des deutschen Volkes.

Storck toured many countries as a soloist and chamber musician. He built an extensive classical and romantic repertoire  He included pieces by lesser-known composers and works of contemporary music in his programs, such as Britten, Martin, Shostakovich, Genzmer, Bialas, Kagel, Baird and Medek, often in world premieres. His programs have been broadcast on radio and television, and he played extensively for recordings. Storck's first recording of Schubert's Arpeggione Sonata on original instruments, with Alfons Kontarsky playing hammerflügel, received special international attention. His chamber music activities have included duos with his wife, the harpist Helga Storck. inspiring composers such as Harald Genzmer to write music for them. He played with pianist Aya Ishihara, and formed the Klaviertrio Alfons Kontarsky, a piano trio with Alfons Kontarsky and violinist Saschko Gawriloff.

Storck also worked as an editor of compositions for cello, and wrote an arrangement of the Arpeggione Sonata for cello and piano, published by Bärenreiter.

Storck was a professor at the Musikhochschule Hannover and the Musikhochschule München, as well as the head of a university class for cello at the Musikhochschule Köln from 1964 to 1971. From 1992 to 2003, he also taught a class of chamber music with harp at the Musikhochschule Weimar. One of his sons is the surgeon and violist .

Storck died in Katowice at the age of 83. His grave is located at the Cologne South Cemetery (Flur 43).

Recordings 

 Vivaldi: Concerto in C minor, RV 434 (with Kammerorchester Emil Seiler, conducted by W. Hofmann), Archiv-Produktion 198 318 (1962) 
 C. Ph. E. Bach: Concerto in A minor, Wq 170 (with the Berliner Kammermusikkreis, conducted by M. Lange), Deutsche Grammophon 135 033 (1963) 
 Brahms: Trio für Klavier, Klarinette und Cello, Op. 114 (with pianist Detlef Kraus and clarinetist Jost Michaels) Musicaphon 30 L 1522 (1963) 

 Kagel: Match für 3 Spieler (with Siegfried Palm and Christoph Caskel), Deutsche Grammophon 137 006 (1968) 

 Schubert: Arpeggione Sonata (with Alfons Kontarsky, Hammerflügel), Archiv-Produktion 2533 175 (1974) 
 Monteverdi: Vespro della Beata Vergine, Regensburg Cathedral Choir, Hanns Martin Schneidt, DG (1975)
 Dvořák and Janáček, Complete Works for Cello and Piano (with Karl Engel), Telefunken 6.42038 (1977) 

 Tadeusz Baird: Szenen für Cello, Harfe und Orchester (with Helga Storck), Polska Nagranie MUZA SX 1615 (1980) 
 Virtuose Gesellschaftsmusik für Harfe und Violoncello ca. 1800 (with Helga Storck), Telefunken SLT 43 109-B (1993) 
 Beethoven und seine Zeit, Werke für Violoncello und Harfe (with Helga Storck), Colosseum COL 9503 (1986) 
 Kleine Werke der Romantik (with pianist Yasuko Matsuda), Colosseum COL 9504 (1988) 
 Louis Spohr: Kammermusik mit Harfe (with Helga Storck and violinist Kurt Guntner), Calig 30837 (1989) 

 Robert Schumann: Complete Works for Violoncello and Piano (with Aya Ishihara, 2010)

References

External links 
 
 
 

German classical cellists
Hochschule für Musik Detmold alumni
Academic staff of the University of Music and Performing Arts Munich
Academic staff of the Hochschule für Musik, Theater und Medien Hannover
Academic staff of the Hochschule für Musik Franz Liszt, Weimar
1928 births
2011 deaths
Musicians from Berlin